The Autobiography is the debut studio album by American rapper Vic Mensa. The album was released on July 28, 2017, by Roc Nation and Capitol Records. The album features guest appearances from Weezer, Syd, The-Dream, Chief Keef, Joey Purp, Pharrell Williams, Saul Williams, Ty Dolla Sign and Pusha T. The album was released for streaming, a week early from its release date via NPR.

Background
On July 11, 2017, the release date for the album was revealed. On July 14, 2017, the album's cover art was released. Vic Mensa explained the concept behind The Autobiography during an interview with Rap-Up, saying:

From a musical standpoint, Vic Mensa drew inspiration from 1990s hip hop while making the album. He recruited No I.D. to executive produce the album. In an interview with Billboard, Mensa stated that No I.D. helped him "create a consolidated, concise body of work."

Singles
The album's lead single "Wings" was released on July 13, 2017. Three tracks from the album, "Rollin Like a Stoner", "Rage" and "OMG" were previously released from his EP The Manuscript, which was a prelude to the album.

Critical reception

At Metacritic, which assigns a weighted average score out of 100 to reviews from mainstream critics, The Autobiography received an average score of 71 based on 12 reviews, indicating "generally favorable reviews".

Will Rosebury of Clash gave the album a 7 out of 10, saying, "Although the succession of lukewarm tracks early on prevents this from being a flawless debut, Vic Mensa does enough to keep the album an engaging listen even in its misguided moments." Jay Balfour of Pitchfork gave the album a 6.9 out of 10, saying, "Perhaps Mensa has been less urgent in developing his artistry, but The Autobiography gathers up all his charms, including his most compelling case as a genre-agnostic vocalist alongside some missed-the-mark rock crossovers."

Jordan Bassett of NME gave the album 4 stars out of 5 and called it "a scattershot album gelled together by Mensa's emotionally frank lyrics, which reveal a complex persona". Nastia Voynovskaya of Paste gave the album a 7.5 out of 10, saying, "Through Mensa's forthright confessions, The Autobiography inspires as much as it speaks to our inner angsty adolescents—the ones who used to hole up in their rooms and blast Linkin Park at night." Christopher Thiessen of PopMatters gave the album 6 stars out of 10, stating that "While it may not be his most innovative offering, detailed execution and honesty make it worthwhile."

On July 25, 2017, it was listed by Stereogum as their album of the week.

Accolades

Commercial performance
The Autobiography debuted at number 27 on the US Billboard 200, selling 15,977 copies in its first week.

Track listing

Notes
  signifies a co-producer
  signifies an additional producer
 "Memories on 47th St." features uncredited vocals by Mr Hudson
 "Heaven on Earth" features additional vocals by Dreezy
 "Card Cracker" skit is performed by Edward "Ugly Eddie" Davis and Deon Cole
 "Down for Some Ignorance (Ghetto Lullaby)" features additional vocals by Ellie "Kyiki" Fletcher
 "Wings" features additional vocals by Mekkel Carter
 "OMG" features uncredited vocals by Pharrell Williams

Sample credits
 "Didn't I (Say I Didn't)" contains elements from "Didn't I", written by William Pulliam and John Tanner, and performed by Darondo.
 "Homewrecker" contains elements from "Good Life", written by Rivers Cuomo, and performed by Weezer.
 "Heaven on Earth" contains an interpolation of "Heaven", written by Andy Barlow and Lou Rhodes.
 "Card Cracker" contains elements from "Love Sosa", written by Keith Cozart and Tyree Pittman, and performed by Chief Keef.
 "Down for Some Ignorance (Ghetto Lullaby)" contains elements from "Down for Some Ignorance", written and performed by Saul Williams.
 "The Fire Next Time" contains elements from "Nobody Knows", written and performed by Pastor T.L. Barrett.

Charts

References

External links
 

2017 debut albums
Vic Mensa albums
Roc Nation albums
Albums produced by No I.D.
Albums produced by Mike Dean (record producer)
Albums produced by Pharrell Williams
Albums produced by 1500 or Nothin'
Albums produced by DJ Dahi
Albums produced by The-Dream
Albums produced by Tricky Stewart